Joseph Charles Brennan VC (August 1818 – 24 September 1872) was an English recipient of the Victoria Cross, the highest and most prestigious award for gallantry in the face of the enemy that can be awarded to British and Commonwealth forces.

He was about 39 years old, and a Bombardier in the Royal Regiment of Artillery, British Army during the Indian Mutiny when the following deed took place on 3 April 1858 at Jhansi, India for which he was awarded the VC:

Further information
Brennan was born in Probus, Cornwall. Also served in the Bhutan War. He later achieved the rank of Sergeant.

References

Location of grave and VC medal (Kent)
VC medal auction details

1836 births
1872 deaths
People from Probus, Cornwall
Royal Artillery soldiers
British recipients of the Victoria Cross
Indian Rebellion of 1857 recipients of the Victoria Cross
British military personnel of the Bhutan War
Deaths from pneumonia in England
British Army recipients of the Victoria Cross
Military personnel from Cornwall